Jesus Church may refer to:

Jesus Church, Troutbeck, an Anglican church in Troutbeck, England
Jesus Church (Oslo), a Pentecostal church in Oslo, Norway
Jesus Church (Cieszyn), a Lutheran church in Cieszyn, Poland
Jesus Church (Berlin-Kaulsdorf), a United church in Berlin, Germany
Jesus Church, Valby, a Church of Denmark church in Copenhagen, Denmark
True Jesus Church, non-denominational Christian church that originated in Beijing, China
Church of Jesus, Riga, a Lutheran church in Riga, Latvia